Esertepe Park (literally Esertepe Park) is a public park in Ankara, Turkey.

Geography 
The  park is at the northern part of Ankara. It is surrounded by high density residential buildings of Etlik.

History 
During the early years of the Turkey, the site was used as an open air range by the Turkish Military. As the growth of the city of Ankara step by step site surrounded by the high density residential buildings. In 1970, Turkish Military stop using site as an open air range due to the safety precautions and left area unused. In 2013, Municipality of Ankara took the site and established Esertepe Park   and opened to the public on 19 May 2015, the National Youth Day.

References 

Parks in Ankara
Urban public parks
1943 establishments in Turkey